The following list of Khmu (Kammu Yuan dialect of Luang Namtha Province, Laos) plant names is from Svantesson et al. (2013).

Flowering plants

Other plants

Fungi

See also
List of Khmu animal common names
Wildlife of Laos

References

Khmu language
Flora of Laos
Names
Environment of Laos
+Khmu